Andrei Stanislavovich Rostotsky (Russian: Андрей Станиславович Ростоцкий, January 25, 1957 – May 5, 2002) was a Soviet Russian film and theatre actor and stunt performer, film director and screenwriter, and also TV host.

Biography
He was son of Stanislav Rostotsky and Nina Menshikova. He received his training at the Gerasimov Institute of Cinematography under the direction of Sergei Bondarchuk. He served in the Soviet Army in the Separate Cavalry Regiment (1978-1980). During his service in the army, Rostotsky starred in the film A Squadron of Hussars Volatile. His popularity continues to grow after the role of Anatoly Kharlampiyev - the father of sambo - in the film Invincible shot by Yuri Boretsky in the early 1980s. In 1990, Rostotski signs his first film as a director with the adaptation of the novel by James Fenimore Cooper The Deerslayer, or The First Warpath where he also plays the main role.

Rostotsky was killed on May 5, 2002 in a climbing accident next to the Maiden Tears Waterfall where he was looking for the platform for the shooting of his new film My Frontier. He is buried in the Vagankovo Cemetery.

Selected filmography
 1975 — On the Edge of the World (На край света) as Palchikov
 1975 — They Fought for Their Country (Они сражались за Родину) as Kochetygov
 1976 — The Days of the Turbins (Дни Турбиных) as Nikolai Turbin
 1980 — Late Emperor of Taiga (Конец императора тайги) as Arkady Petrovich Golikov
 1980 — Squadron of Flying Hussars (Эскадрон гусар летучих) as Denis Davydov
 1981 — True of Lieutenant Klimov (Правда лейтенанта Климова) as Lieutenant Klimov
 1983 — Invincible (Непобедимый) as Andrei Khromov
 1984 — 1st Cavalry Army (Первая конная) as Aleksa Dundić
 1986 — Breakthrough (Прорыв) as Martynov, head of the mine
 1989 — Mother (Мать) as Nicholas II of Russia
 1993 — Dreams (Сны) as Nicholas II of Russia
 1996 — Whoever Softer (Тот, кто нежнее) as Ramazan
 2002 — Drongo (Дронго) as Heron

Awards and honours
 Honored Artist of the RSFSR (1991)

References

External links 
 

1957 births
2002 deaths
Russian male actors
Soviet male actors
Soviet film directors
Russian film directors
Male screenwriters
Honored Artists of the RSFSR
Recipients of the Lenin Komsomol Prize
Gerasimov Institute of Cinematography alumni
Deaths from falls
Male actors from Moscow
Burials at Vagankovo Cemetery
Filmed deaths of entertainers
20th-century Russian screenwriters
20th-century Russian male writers